Sebastapistes cyanostigma, the yellowspotted scorpionfish, coral scorpionfish or pink and yellow scorpionfish''', is a species of marine ray-finned fish belonging to the family Scorpaenidae, the scorpionfishes. It is found in the Indo-Pacific. It occasionally makes its way into the aquarium trade. It grows to 10 cm in length.

TaxonomySebastapistes cyanostigma was first formally described in 1856 as Scorpaena cyanostigma by the Dutch physician, herpetologist and ichthyologist Pieter Bleeker with the type locality given as Kajeli on Buru, one of the Molucca Islands in Indonesia. The specific name cyanostigma is a compound of cyano, which means "blue", and stigma, meaning "mark" or "spot", an allusion to the pearly or light-blue spots on the body.

DescriptionSebastapistes cyanostigma has 12 spines and 9 or 10 soft rays in the dorsal fin and 3 spines and 5 or 6 soft rays in the anal fin. The overall colour is pinkish to reddish with numerous very small whitish spots and large yellow blotches with yellowish fins.

Distribution and habitatSebastapistes cyanostigma has a wide Indo-Pacific distribution, from the Red Sea and the eastern coast of Africa as far south as South Africa east through the coasts and islands of the Indian and Pacific Oceans as far east as Tonga, north to southern Japan and south to northern Australia.

BiologySebastapistes cyanostigma is a nocturnal ambush predator. In the day they hide mostly within the heads of corals in the genus Pocillopora, emerging at night to place themselves in a suitable site from which to ambush passing prey. They feed on small fishes, crustaceans and zooplanktonic making short darts forward to capture prey and rarely leave the shelter of the reef to avoid predation. They are probably oviparous, like other closely related scorpionfishes, with the females  releasing the internally fertilised egg which float near the surface. The observations of small groups in the Spring may be a mating behaviour. It van also be found around fire corals in the genera Millepora and Stylophora. The species has venomous fin spines. The prey is engulfed in the relatively large mouth.

UtilisationSebastapistes cyanostigma'' is rare in the aquarium trade.

References

External links
 

cyanostigma
Taxa named by Pieter Bleeker
Fish described in 1856